Lília Cabral Bertolli Figueiredo (born 13 July 1957) is a Brazilian actress. She has already been nominated twice to the International Emmy Award for Best Actress.

Biography 
She is daughter of an Italian father, Gino Bertolli, and a Portuguese mother, Almedina Cabral, who was born in São Miguel, Azores. Lilia lost her mother when she was very young, before she started working in television, which she deeply resents, as her mother never had the opportunity to see her work as an actress. She is from the São Paulo neighborhood of Lapa, where she spent her childhood, but has lived in Rio de Janeiro for over twenty years.

Career

Cabral began her career in the theater performing in the play Feliz Ano Velho, based on a book by Marcelo Rubens Paiva.

She debuted on television in 1981 in the telenovela Os Adolescentes, written by Ivani Ribeiro and produced by Rede Bandeirantes.

In 1984, she signed contract with Rede Globo to act in Corpo a Corpo, by Gilberto Braga, and there she remains today.

In 2003, Lilia Cabral participated in Chocolate com Pimenta as the comic villainess Bárbara. Later, she joined the cast of Começar de Novo as Aída, the owner of a famous spa.

In 2006, she starred as the main antagonist in Páginas da Vida as the insensitive bitter Marta. For her brilliant performance she received the Trophy Press award for Best Actress. She was also nominated for an International Emmy Award for Best Actress in 2007, but she lost the award to the French actress Muriel Robin for her part as Marie Besnard in The Poisoner.

In 2010, she was nominated for the second time to the International Emmy Award for Best Actress for her role in the telenovela Viver a Vida.

Cabral starred as the protagonist Griselda Pereira in the telenovela Fina Estampa in 2011. In 2012, she won two Best Actress awards for her excellent portrayal of Griselda.

Personal life
Her first marriage was to filmmaker João Henrique Jardim when she was very young, but the marriage didn't last long. Since 1994, she has been married to the economist Iwan Figueiredo, who is the father of her only daughter, Giulia Bertolli, who was born when Lilia was 38. The pregnancy was not planned. She suffered three miscarriages before her pregnancy.

Filmography

Television

Film

Awards and nominations

References

External links 

1957 births
Living people
Actresses from São Paulo
Brazilian people of Italian descent
Brazilian people of Portuguese descent
Brazilian people of Azorean descent
Brazilian telenovela actresses
Brazilian film actresses
Brazilian stage actresses
20th-century Brazilian actresses
21st-century Brazilian actresses